47, 47 or forty-seven may refer to: 

47 (number)
47 BC
AD 47
1947
2047
'47 (brand), an American clothing brand
47 (magazine), an American publication
 47 (song), a song by Sidhu Moose Wala
47, a song by New Found Glory from the album Not Without a Fight
"Forty Seven", a song by Karma to Burn from the album V, 2011
+47, the international calling code for Norway
4seven, a television channel
Agent 47, protagonist of the Hitman video game series
47, a young adult novel by Walter Mosley

See also
 List of highways numbered 47
 Channel 47 (disambiguation)
 M47 (disambiguation), including "Model 47" (M47)
 Forty-seven Ronin (disambiguation)
 A47 (disambiguation)
 Capital Steez